Louise Elizabeth Pajo (31 July 1940 – 23 November 2020) also credited as Louise R. Pajo, Louise Pago and Therese Pajo. was a New Zealand-born television and film actress, who worked in productions in her native country, but also in Britain and Australia, starting from 1965 until 1999.

Biography
 
Born in Hastings, New Zealand of Estonian descent; she trained in RADA in the United Kingdom. After graduating in 1966 she went on to appear in many popular British television programmes, including The Avengers and Doctor Who in The Seeds of Death.

Her British film roles included Jane Eyre (1970) and Sex and the Other Woman (1972).  
 
She subsequently immigrated to Australia in the late 1970s where she continued her acting career, appearing in films such as Dawn! in 1979, Far East and Norman Loves Rose in 1982.

In 1977, Pajo joined the cast of Cop Shop as Don McKenna's wife, Carol. Other notable roles include the three episode guest role of Helen Masters in Prisoner in 1979. This was followed by the regular role of the snobbish Margery Carson in Carson's Law for its entire two-year run, airing from January 1983 to December 1984. Other Australian series she has featured include roles  in The Flying Doctors, Brides of Christ, A Country Practice and Home and Away. Her last known on screen role was in Big Sky in 1999, and she retired from acting in 2000 at age 60.

During her retirement, Pajo would occasionally appear at Doctor Who signings and question and answer events. Two of her most recent appearances at such events were at the "Fantom Autumn Signing Spectacular" in Chiswick on 21 October 2017, and at the Fantom Films Galaxy 4 event in Sheffield on 28 October 2017.

Louise Pajo died on 23 November 2020, aged 80.

Filmography

FILM

TELEVISION

References

External links

1940 births
2020 deaths
New Zealand people of Estonian descent
New Zealand film actresses
New Zealand soap opera actresses
New Zealand television actresses
Australian film actresses
Australian soap opera actresses
British film actresses
British soap opera actresses
British television actresses
People from Hastings, New Zealand
20th-century Australian actresses
20th-century British actresses
20th-century New Zealand actresses
21st-century Australian women
21st-century Australian people